Proglumide (Milid) is a drug that inhibits gastrointestinal motility and reduces gastric secretions. It acts as a cholecystokinin antagonist, which blocks both the CCKA and CCKB subtypes. It was used mainly in the treatment of stomach ulcers, although it has now been largely replaced by newer drugs for this application.

An interesting side effect of proglumide is that it enhances the analgesia produced by opioid drugs, and can prevent or even reverse the development of tolerance to opioid drugs. This can make it a useful adjuvant treatment to use alongside opioid drugs in the treatment of chronic pain conditions such as cancer, where opioid analgesics may be required for long periods and development of tolerance reduces clinical efficacy of these drugs.

Proglumide has also been shown to act as a δ-opioid agonist, which may contribute to its analgesic effects.

Proglumide also works as a placebo effect amplifier for pain conditions. When injected visibly to a subject, its analgesic effect is bigger than a similarly administered placebo. When injected secretly, it does not have any effect, whereas standard pain drugs have an effect, even if they are administered without the subject's awareness. The supposed mechanism is an enhancement of the neural pathways of expectation as a result of dopamine and endogenous opioids being suddenly released throughout numerous structures of the brain and spinal cord.

The ventral tegmental area is the structure believed to mediate proglumide's analgesic and euphoric effects, however dozens of areas with a wide range of physical and psychological functions are implicated in the mediation of the placebo effect (this accounts for proglumide's ability to produce physically measurable effects on vital signs such as heart rate, blood pressure, respiration rate, and tidal volume which can not be accounted for by its clinically insignificant δ-opioid affinity.

See also 
 Proglumetacin

References 

Cholecystokinin antagonists
Benzamides
Propyl compounds